Qalqilya or Qalqiliya is a Palestinian city in the West Bank which serves as the administrative center of the Qalqilya Governorate of the State of Palestine. In the 2007 census, the city had a population of 41,739. Qalqilya is surrounded by the Israeli West Bank wall, with a narrow gap in the east controlled by the Israeli military and a tunnel to the Palestinian town of Hableh. Qalqilya is under the administration of the Palestinian National Authority (as part of Area A), while remaining under Israeli military occupation. Oranges are a major part of the city's economy.

Etymology
Qalqilya was known as Calecailes in the Roman period, and Calcelie in the Frankish sources from the early Medieval times. The word "Qalqilya" might be derived from a Canaanite term which means "rounded stones or hills".According to E.H. Palmer, the name came from "a type of pomegranate", or "gurgling of water".

History
The vicinity of Qalqilya has been populated since prehistoric times, as attested to by the discovery of prehistoric flint tools.

Ottoman era
In 1596, Qalqilya appeared in Ottoman tax registers (transliterated as Qalqili) as a village in the nahiya (subdistrict) of Bani Sa'b in the Liwa of Nablus. It had a population of 13 Muslim households and paid a total of 3,910 akçe in taxes on wheat, barley, summer crops, olives, and goats or beehives.

In 1838, Edward Robinson noted Kulakilieh as a village in Beni Sa'ab district, west of Nablus.

In 1870, Victor Guérin said it was a village with 200 inhabitants.

In 1882, Qalqilya was described as "A large somewhat straggling village, with cisterns to the north and a pool on the south-west. The houses are badly built." In 1883 some moved there from nearby Baqat al-Hatab, and in 1909 a  municipal council to administer Qalqilya was established.

British Mandate era

In the 1922 census of Palestine conducted by the British Mandate authorities, Qalqilya had a population of 2,803 (2,794 Muslims and 9 Christians), increasing in the 1931 census to 3,867 (3,855 Muslims and 12 Christians), in a total of 796 houses.

In the 1945 statistics the population of Qalqilya was 5,850; 5,840 Muslims and 10 Christians, who owned 27,915 dunams of land according to an official land and population survey. Of this, 3701 dunams were for citrus and bananas, 3,232 were plantations and irrigable land, 16,197 used for cereals, while 273 dunams were built-up (urban) land.

1948 War
In the wake of the 1948 Arab–Israeli War, and after the 1949 Armistice Agreements, Qalqilya came under Jordanian rule. During the war, many inhabitants from nearby villages, including Kafr Saba, Abu Kishk, Miska, Biyar 'Adas and Shaykh Muwannis fled to Qalqilya as refugees.

Following the battle of the nearby Arab village of Kafr Saba, the residents of Qalqilya fled and later returned with the arrival of the Jordanian Arab Legion and the Iraqi expeditionary force, except for some 2,000 upper class residents who moved to Nablus. The main reason for the partial return was the difficult economic situation in the front-line town and the inability to access the crop fields.

Jordanian era

The area was annexed by Jordan in 1950. On the night of 10 October 1956 the Israeli army launched a raid against Qalqilya police station in response to a Jordanian attack on Israeli bus, among other incidents. The attack was ordered by Moshe Dayan and involved several thousand soldiers. During the fighting a paratroop company was surrounded by Jordanian troops and the survivors only escaped under close air-cover from four Israeli Air Force aircraft. Eighteen Israelis and between 70 and 90 Jordanians were killed in the operation.

In 1961, the population of Qalqilya was 11,401.

Post 1967

Since the Six-Day War in 1967, Qalqilya has been under Israeli occupation. Later that year, dozens of its inhabitants were evicted by Israel to Jordan, and at least 850 buildings were razed. In his memoirs, Moshe Dayan described the destruction as a "punishment" that was designed to chase the inhabitants away contrary to the government policy. The villagers were eventually allowed to return and the reconstruction of damaged houses was financed by the military authorities. In September 1967, a census found 8,922 persons, of whom 1,837 were originally from Israeli territory.

As part of the 1993 Oslo Accords between Israel and the Palestine Liberation Organization (PLO), control of Qalqilya was transferred to the Palestinian National Authority (PNA) on 17 December 1995.

In 2003, the Israeli West Bank barrier was built, encircling the town and separating it from agricultural lands on the other side of the wall.

In November 2015, Israel arrested what it alleged to be a network of 24 Hamas militants active in the city.

On 20 October 2017, the Palestinian city of Qalqilya named a street after Saddam Hussein and erected a memorial with his likeness, according to an Israeli newspaper. The monument was unveiled at a ceremony attended by the Qalqilya District Governor Rafi Rawajba and two other Palestinian officials. It bears the slogan “Saddam Hussein – The Master of the Martyrs in Our Age”.

On 19 June 2022, a 53-year-old unarmed Palestinian was shot and killed by Israeli forces as he allegedly sought to cross the Israeli West Bank barrier, which encircles Qalqilya.

Geography
Qalqilya is located in the northwestern West Bank, straddling the border with Israel. It is 16 kilometers southwest of the Palestinian city of Tulkarm, and the nearest localities are the Arab-Israeli city of Tira and the Palestinian hamlet of 'Arab al-Ramadin al-Shamali to the northeast, the Palestinian village of Nabi Ilyas to the east, the Palestinian hamlets 'Arab Abu Farda and 'Arab ar-Ramadin al-Janubi and the Israeli settlement of Alfei Menashe to the southwest, and the Palestinian village Habla and Arab-Israeli town of Jaljuliya to the south. It contains the point in the West Bank closest to the Mediterranean Sea, with about 14 km to the coast at Shefayim.

Qalqilya has an average elevation of 57 meters above sea level. The average annual rainfall 587.4 millimeters and the average annual temperature is 19 degrees Celsius.

Demographics
The 1997 census by the Palestinian Central Bureau of Statistics (PCBS) recorded Qalqilya's population to be 22,168. The majority of the inhabitants (69.8%) were Palestinian refugees or their descendants. In the 2007 census, Qalqilya's population was 41,739 (50.9% male and (49.1% female). The number of registered households was 7,866.
In the 2017 census, Qalqiliya's population was 51,683.

Government
Hamas won the 2006 municipal elections in Qalqiliya and one of its members, Wajih Qawas, became mayor, although he was incarcerated by Israel for much of his term. On 12 September 2009, the PNA dismissed Qawas for allowing Qalqiliya's debt to grow unchecked, failing to attract international funding for city projects and ignoring orders by the Palestinian government. Qawas, however, viewed his dismissal as a result of the ongoing feud between Hamas, which dominates the PNA in the Gaza Strip and Fatah, which dominates the PNA in the West Bank. Human rights groups criticized Qawas's dismissal, condemning the intervention by the central Palestinian authorities in the affairs of an elected official. During the 2012 municipal elections, Fatah member Othman Dawood was elected mayor.

Economy

Between 1967 and 1995 almost 80 percent of Qalqilya's labor force worked for Israeli companies or industries in the construction and agriculture sectors. The remaining 20% engaged in trade and commerce, marketing across the Green Line. According to a field survey taken by the Applied Research Institute-Jerusalem (ARIJ), 45% of Qalqilya's working population was employed by government, 25% worked in agriculture, 15% worked in trade and commerce, 10% worked in industry and 5% worked in Israeli labor. In 2012, the unemployment rate was 22%, with those most affected formerly employed in agriculture, trade and services.

Qalqilya is particularly known for its citrus crop and of its total of 10,252 dunams of land, (of which 5,930 are arable) 1802 dunams (about 17.6% of the city's land and over 30% of its arable land) are planted with citrus trees. Other major crops are olives and vegetables. Local industries include the manufacture of foodstuffs, olive oil, dairy products, soap, glass, stone, marble and building materials, in addition to the manufacture of wood, and mineral water companies.

The Qalqilya Zoo, established in 1986, is currently the only zoo in the West Bank and in the State of Palestine, and, according to its owner, is the city's single-largest employer. It serves as one of Qalqilya's main attractions. The zoo houses 170 animals and works closely with zoologists from the Jerusalem Biblical Zoo and the Ramat Gan Safari.The only factory for prosthetic limbs in the northern West Bank is in Qalqilya.

Souqs 
In Qalqilya there are many markets, including:

 Souq Abu Amsha (سوق أبو عمشة)
 Souq Shaheen (سوق شاهين)
 Souq Abu Jaber (سوق أبو جابر)
 Souq Beshara (سوق بشارة)
 Souq Uthman  (سوق عثمان)
 Souq Shawer (سوق شاور)
 Souq Al-Aqsa (سوق الأقصى)

Land usage and the barrier
Of the city's total area of 10,252 dunams, 3,027 were built-up areas, 266 were used for industrial purposes, 2,894 were planted with permanent crops, 419 were used for greenhouses, 274 for livestock ranges, 2,343 others were classified as arable, and 283 dunams were occupied by the West Bank barrier. Nearly all of Qalqilya's urban area is under Palestinian civil jurisdiction and Israeli military control (Area B), while 64.7% of the city's municipal territory, mostly agricultural lands and open spaces, is under Israeli civil and military control (Area C).

Israel's construction of the barrier began in 2002 and isolates Qalqilya from the north, west, south, and half of its eastern side, leaving a corridor in the east connecting it with smaller Palestinian villages and hamlets. Israel states its construction of the wall is for security purposes, particularly to prevent infiltration by Palestinian militants into Israel as had occurred during the Second Intifada. The Palestinians state that the barrier is meant to annex Palestinian lands (since the wall often juts deep into Palestinian territory) and control the movement of Palestinians. The barrier has negatively affected Qalqilya's economy, particularly the commercial and trade sectors, because it has separated the city from nearby Palestinian localities and bordering Arab towns in Israel, which contributed about 40% of the city's income prior to the barrier's completion. The barrier has also separated 1,836 dunams of mostly agricultural lands and open spaces within Qalqilya's jurisdiction from the city proper. Social relations between Qalqilya's inhabitants and those of other Palestinian cities have also been hindered by the barrier.

Education
According to the 2007 PCBS census, 95.3% of the inhabitants over the age of 10 were literate. About 75% of the illiterate population were women. The town has 21 public schools, four private schools, three schools managed by UNRWA and 13 kindergartens. All schools are overseen by the Palestinian Ministry of Higher Education. As of 2012, there were 12,286 residents enrolled in school, with 660 teaching staff. In 2007, 10.5% of the population had graduated from an institution of higher education, while 15.7% had completed secondary education, 27.5% preparatory education, 27.4% elementary education and 13.8% had no formal education. There are two colleges in the city: the Ad Da'wa Islamic College established in 1978 and a campus of the Al-Quds Open University established in 1998.

Culture 
There are charities, recreational and cultural clubs, Qalqilya TV, and a radio station (Radio Nagham). In the Qalqilya governorate, the NGO Cultural Forum Society (جمعية منتدى المقفين الخيرية) played a role in publicizing the residents' economic and political problems due to the occupation, the wall, and settlements.

International relations 
Qalqilya is twinned with:
  Mülheim, friendship.

Notable people

 Bahaa Al-Din Dawood Bin Ismail Al-Qalqili, a scholar of the eighth century AH who taught in Aleppo and died in the year 780 AH, according to the book '"Fragments of Gold in News from Gold by Ibn General Shihab al-Din al-Hanbali al-Dimashqi
 Abu Ali Iyad, Fatah field commander in Jordan and Syria
 Najm al-Din Muhammad ibn Ahmad al-Qalqili, a scholar born in Qalqilya who moved to Al-Quds Al-Sharif as a child and later went Cairo to study at Al-Azhar University. In Egypt he compiled his book Ghani al-Murayd to know perfection and intonation'', completed in 882 AH
 Khair al-Din Abu al-Khair Ahmad bin Shihab al-Din Ahmad bin Muhammad al-Qalqili, a reciter of Quran (died in 89 AH)
 Sheikh Mustafa Sabry (1870–1957), a religious orator (khatib خطيب) and reformer
 Ibrahim Ahmed Al-Shanti (Qalqilya, 1927–Amman, 2018), a writer and journalist
 Hashem El-Seba (1912–1957), a Palestinian militant
 Muayad Afaneh, (born 1975), prepared an analytical paper on the political, economic and social situation of Qalqilya Governorate

References

Bibliography

External links
Welcome To The City of Qalqiliya
Qalqilya City, Welcome to Palestine
Qalqiliya City (Fact Sheet), Applied Research Institute–Jerusalem, (ARIJ)
Qalqiliya City Profile, ARIJ
Qalqiliya aerial photo, ARIJ
Development Priorities and Needs in Qalqiliya, ARIJ
Survey of Western Palestine, Map 11: IAA, Wikimedia commons 

 
Qalqilyah
Qalqilya Governorate